The National Forest Act, the name of several United States federal laws, may refer to:

Forest Reserve Act of 1891, which established the U.S. National forests
Forest Management Act, United States statute in 1897
National Forest Management Act of 1976, which addresses the management of renewable resources on national forest lands
Caribbean National Forest Act of 2005, Public Law 109-118, which designates certain National Forest System land in the Commonwealth of Puerto Rico as components of the National Wilderness Preservation

United States federal public land legislation
National Forests of the United States